L60 can refer to:

IFA L60, a 1980s truck built in East Germany
Stridsvagn L-60, a 1930s light tank built in Sweden
Suzuki L60, a 1970s two-stroke vehicle engine
Suzuki L60V, a 1970s model of Suzuki Carry vehicle powered by the L60 engine
Leyland L60, a 1960s tank engine
Bofors 40 mm gun (L/60), a Swedish anti-aircraft gun.